John Holmes (1838 – 3 July 1907) was a 19th-century Member of Parliament from Christchurch in the Canterbury region of New Zealand.

Holmes was born in Ireland in 1838, and emigrated first to Victoria and then to New Zealand.

He represented the Christchurch South electorate from 1881 to 1887, when he retired.

Holmes was a barrister and solicitor in Christchurch. He set up a law firm in 1868. He later went into partnership with Andrew Loughrey. The firm is today known as Lane Neave.

Holmes lived in retirement on his estate, "Viewmount", near Methven. He later returned to live in Christchurch, where he died on 3 July 1907. He was buried in Methven Cemetery.

References

1838 births
1907 deaths
Irish emigrants to New Zealand (before 1923)
Members of the New Zealand House of Representatives
New Zealand MPs for Christchurch electorates
19th-century New Zealand politicians